Theodore Edward (Theodor Edvard) Cantor (1809–1860) was a Danish physician, zoologist and botanist.

Born to a Danish Jewish family, his mother was a sister of Nathaniel Wallich.  Cantor worked for the British East India Company, and made natural history collections in Penang and Malacca.

Cantor was the first Western scientist to describe the Siamese fighting fish. In the scientific field of herpetology he described many new species of reptiles and amphibians. Species first described by Cantor include Bungarus bungaroides (1839), Bungarus lividus (1839), Channa argus (1842), Elaphe rufodorsata (1842), Euprepiophis mandarinus (1842), Hippocampus comes (1850), Lycodon effraenis (1847), Misgurnus anguillicaudatus (1842), Naja atra (1842), Oligodon albocinctus (1839), Oligodon cyclurus (1839), Ophiophagus hannah (1836), Oreocryptophis porphyracea (1839), Pareas monticola (1839), Protobothrops mucrosquamatus (1839), Ptyas dhumnades (1842), and Trimeresurus erythrurus (1839).

The snake genus Cantoria with the type species Cantoria violacea (Cantor's water snake) is named in Cantor's honour, as are Acanthodactylus cantoris (Indian fringe-fingered lizard), Elaphe cantoris (eastern trinket snake), Hydrophis cantoris (Cantor's small-headed sea snake), Pelochelys cantorii (Cantor's giant softshell turtle), and Trimeresurus cantori (Cantor's pit viper).

He was the author of:
 Notes respecting some Indian fishes (1839)

See also
:Category:Taxa named by Theodore Edward Cantor

References 

1809 births
1860 deaths
19th-century Danish zoologists
Jewish Danish scientists